Diane Ayala Goldner (born January 9, 1956) is an actress. She is best known for her roles in her husband, John Gulager's film series Feast.

Filmography
 Honeymoon (1998) as Laura
 The Poet Writes His Wife (2002) as Caitlan Thomas
 Adam's Apocalypse (2003) as Boss
 Feast (2005) as Harley Mom
 Vic (2006) as Cashier
 Satanic (2006) as Jackie
 Feast II: Sloppy Seconds (2008) as Biker Queen
 Pulse 2: Afterlife (2008) as Mrs. Sorenstram
 Pulse 3 (2008) as Sarah Wilkie
 Feast III: The Happy Finish (2009) as Biker Queen
 The Collector (2009) as Gena Morton
 Halloween II (2009) as Jane Salvador
 Ashes (2010) as Homeless Woman
 This Never Happened (2011) as Priscilla
 The Key to Annabel Lee (2011) as The Partner
 The Night Plays Tricks (2011) as D.
 Stay at Home Dad (2012) as Dr. Kravitz
 Moments (2012) as Unknown Role
 Hatchet III (2013) as Elbert
 Whispers (2013) as Dr. Chandler
 Children of the Corn: Runaway (2018) as Mrs. Dawkins
 Bad Apples (2018) as Mrs. Dekker

References

External links 
 
 
 

1956 births
American film actresses
American television actresses
Living people
21st-century American women